Winifred Alice "Freda" James (married name Hammersley) (11 January 1911 – 27 December 1988) was a British female tennis player of the 1930s.

She won the women's doubles in Grand Slam events three times : in 1933 at the US Women's National Championship (with Betty Nuthall), and twice at Wimbledon in 1935 and 1936 (with Kay Stammers).

From 1931 to 1939, she was part of the British team in the Wightman Cup.

Grand Slam finals

Doubles (3 titles, 2 runner-ups)

References

1911 births
1988 deaths
English female tennis players
Sportspeople from Nottingham
United States National champions (tennis)
Wimbledon champions (pre-Open Era)
Grand Slam (tennis) champions in women's doubles
British female tennis players
Tennis people from Nottinghamshire